Wolfgang "Teddy" de Beer (born 2 January 1964) is a retired German footballer who played as a goalkeeper with MSV Duisburg and Borussia Dortmund.

He worked as a goalkeeping coach at his former club Borussia Dortmund up until his retirement in 2018.

He started his career with TV Jahn Hiesfeld, before joining MSV Duisburg, making his Bundesliga debut for them on 22 May 1982.

Honours
Borussia Dortmund
 DFB-Pokal: 1988–89
 DFL-Supercup: 1989
 UEFA Champions League: 1996–97
 Intercontinental Cup: 1997

References

External links
 

1964 births
Living people
German footballers
Germany under-21 international footballers
Association football goalkeepers
MSV Duisburg players
Borussia Dortmund players
Bundesliga players
2. Bundesliga players
UEFA Champions League winning players
Borussia Dortmund non-playing staff
Association football goalkeeping coaches
West German footballers